PARC (Palo Alto Research Center; formerly Xerox PARC) is a research and development company in Palo Alto, California.  Founded in 1969 by Jacob E. "Jack" Goldman, chief scientist of Xerox Corporation, the company was originally a division of Xerox, tasked with creating computer technology-related products and hardware systems.
Xerox PARC has been at the heart of numerous revolutionary computer developments, including laser printing, Ethernet, the modern personal computer, GUI (graphical user interface) and desktop paradigm, object-oriented programming, ubiquitous computing, electronic paper, a-Si (amorphous silicon) applications, the computer mouse, and VLSI (very-large-scale integration) for semiconductors.  

Unlike Xerox's existing research laboratory in Rochester, New York, which focused on refining and expanding the company's copier business, Goldman's “Advanced Scientific & Systems Laboratory” aimed to pioneer new technologies in advanced physics, materials science, and computer science applications.

In 2002, Xerox spun off Palo Alto Research Center Incorporated as a wholly owned subsidiary.

History

In 1969, Goldman talked with George Pake, a physicist specializing in nuclear magnetic resonance and provost of Washington University in St. Louis, about starting a second research center for Xerox.

On July 1, 1970, the Xerox Palo Alto Research Center opened. Its 3,000-mile distance from Xerox headquarters in Rochester, New York, afforded scientists at the new lab great freedom to undertake their work, but it also increased the difficulty of persuading management of the promise of some of their greatest achievements.

In its early years, PARC's West Coast location helped it hire many employees of the nearby SRI Augmentation Research Center (ARC) as that facility's funding began falling, from the Defense Advanced Research Projects Agency (DARPA), National Aeronautics and Space Administration (NASA) and the U.S. Air Force. By leasing land at Stanford Research Park, it encouraged Stanford University graduate students to be involved in PARC research projects and PARC scientists to collaborate with academic seminars and projects.

Much of PARC's early success in the computer field was under the leadership of its Computer Science Laboratory manager Bob Taylor, who guided the lab as associate manager from 1970 to 1977 and as manager from 1977 to 1983.

Work at PARC since the early 1980s includes advances in ubiquitous computing, aspect-oriented programming, and IPv6.

After three decades as a division of Xerox, PARC was transformed in 2002 into an independent, wholly owned subsidiary company dedicated to developing and maturing advances in science and business concepts.

Accomplishments
PARC's developments in information technology served for a long time as standards for much of the computing industry. Many advances were not equalled or surpassed for two decades, enormous timespans in the fast-paced high-tech world. Xerox PARC has been the inventor and incubator of many elements of modern computing:

Laser printers
Computer-generated bitmap graphics
The graphical user interface, featuring skeuomorphic windows and icons, operated with a mouse
Bravo, the WYSIWYG modal text editor
Interpress, a resolution-independent graphical page-description language and the precursor to PostScript
Ethernet as a local-area computer network
Fully formed  object-oriented programming (OOP) (with class-based inheritance, the most popular OOP model to this day) in the Smalltalk programming language and integrated development environment
Prototype-based programming (the second most popular inheritance model in  OOP) in the Self programming language
Model–view–controller software architecture
AspectJ, an aspect-oriented programming (AOP) extension for the Java programming language

The Alto

Most of these developments were included in the Alto, which added the now familiar Stanford Research Institute (SRI) developed mouse, unifying into a single model most aspects of now-standard personal computer use. The integration of Ethernet prompted the development of the PARC Universal Packet architecture, much like today's Internet.

The GUI
Xerox has been heavily criticized (particularly by business historians) for failing to properly commercialize and profitably exploit PARC's innovations. A favorite example is the graphical user interface (GUI), initially developed at PARC for the Alto and then sold as the Xerox Star by the Xerox Systems Development Department. It heavily influenced future system design, but is deemed a failure because it only sold about 25,000 units. A small group from PARC led by David Liddle and Charles Irby formed Metaphor Computer Systems. They extended the Star desktop concept into an animated graphic and communicating office-automation model and sold the company to IBM.

Microsoft founder Bill Gates has said that the Xerox graphical interface influenced both Microsoft and Apple. Steve Jobs of Apple said that “Xerox could have owned the entire computer industry, could have been the IBM of the nineties, could have been the Microsoft of the nineties."

While there is some truth that Xerox management failed to see the potential of many of PARC's inventions, this was mostly a problem with its computing research, a relatively small part of PARC's operations. A number of GUI engineers left to join Apple Computer. Technologies pioneered by its materials scientists such as liquid-crystal display (LCD), optical disc innovations, and laser printing were actively and successfully introduced by Xerox to the business and consumer markets.

Distinguished researchers

Among PARC's distinguished researchers were three Turing Award winners: Butler W. Lampson (1992), Alan Kay (2003), and Charles P. Thacker (2009). The Association for Computing Machinery (ACM) Software System Award recognized the Alto system in 1984, Smalltalk in 1987, InterLisp in 1992, and the remote procedure call in 1994. Lampson, Kay,  Bob Taylor, and Charles P. Thacker received the National Academy of Engineering's prestigious Charles Stark Draper Prize in 2004 for their work on the Alto.

See also

GlobalView
List of people associated with PARC
Xerox Daybreak (a.k.a. Xerox Windows 6085)

References

Further reading
Michael A. Hiltzik, Dealers of Lightning: Xerox PARC and the Dawn of the Computer Age (HarperCollins, New York, 1999) 
Douglas K. Smith, Robert C. Alexander, Fumbling the Future: How Xerox Invented, Then Ignored, the First Personal Computer (William Morrow and Company, New York, 1988) 
M. Mitchell Waldrop, The Dream Machine:  J.C.R. Licklider and the Revolution That Made Computing Personal (Viking Penguin, New York, 2001) 
Howard Rheingold, Tools for Thought (MIT Press, 2000) 
Todd R. Weiss, "Xerox PARC turns 40: Making four decades of tech innovation" Computerworld, 2010

External links

PARC official website
Xerox Star Historical Documents
MacKiDo article
Oral history interview with Terry Allen Winograd Charles Babbage Institute, University of Minnesota, Minneapolis
Oral history interview with Paul A. Strassmann Charles Babbage Institute, University of Minnesota, Minneapolis
Oral history interview with William Crowther Charles Babbage Institute, University of Minnesota, Minneapolis

PARC
History of human–computer interaction
Software companies based in the San Francisco Bay Area
Technology transfer
Flexible displays
Research organizations in the United States
Companies based in Palo Alto, California
Technology companies established in 1970
Software companies of the United States
Science and technology in the San Francisco Bay Area
Research and development in the United States
Corporate spin-offs
1970 establishments in California